Mir Mirab, also known as Mileh Mirab may refer to:
 Mir Mirab-e Olya
 Mir Mirab-e Sofla